Before the Jury (Italian title:Corte d'Assise) is a 1931 Italian crime film directed by Guido Brignone and starring Marcella Albani, Lia Franca and Carlo Ninchi. It was made at the Cines Studios in Rome. The film is a precursor to the later genre of Giallo films.

Cast
 Marcella Albani as Leda Astorri  
 Lia Franca as Dora Bardi  
 Carlo Ninchi as Marcello Barra, il guardacaccia  
 Renzo Ricci as Aroldo Cramoli  
 Elio Steiner as Giulio Alberti  
 Elvira Marchionni as La cognata del guardiacaccia 
 Giovanni Cimara as Alberto Astorri  
 Camillo De Rossi as Adolfo Calandri  
 Vasco Creti as Giovanni, il cameriere di casa Astorri  
 Franco Coop as Il portiere di casa Calandri 
 Giorgio Bianchi as Lo sconosciuoto 
 Luigi Carini as Il presidente del tribunale  
 Raimondo Van Riel as Il procuratore generale 
 Oreste Fares as L'avvocato difensore 
 Nino Altieri
 Augusto Bandini 
 Vittorio Bianchi
 Amerigo Bombrazzi 
 Mercedes Brignone
 Rosetta Calavetta
 Bruno Castellani 
 Alberto Castelli 
 Francesco Ciancamerla 
 Umberto Cocchi 
 Enrico De Martino 
 Jolanda Di Lorenzo
 Clara Di Martignano 
 Giuseppe Farnesi 
 Tullio Galvani
 Giuseppe Gambardella
 Walter Grant 
 Umberto Maestri 
 Enrico Marignetti 
 Angelo Marsili
 Alfredo Martinelli 
 Roberto Pasetti 
 Giuseppe Pierozzi
 Rinaldo Rinaldi
 Flora Rossini
 Gino Sabbatini 
 Umberto Sacripante
 Franz Sala 
 Salvatore Schiavo 
 Lorenzo Soderini 
 Elena Zoar

References

Bibliography 
 Moliterno, Gino. A to Z of Italian Cinema. Scarecrow Press, 2009.

External links 

1931 films
Italian crime films
1931 crime films
1930s Italian-language films
Films directed by Guido Brignone
Cines Studios films
Italian black-and-white films
1930s Italian films